Sympycnodes is a genus of moths in the family Cossidae.

Species
unnamed group
Sympycnodes rhaptodes Turner, 1942
Sympycnodes tripartita (T.P. Lucas, 1892) (=Sympycnodes trigonocosma Turner, 1932)
epicycla group
Sympycnodes epicycla (Turner, 1945)
Sympycnodes arachnophora (Turner, 1945)
digitata group
Sympycnodes adrienneae Kallies & D.J. Hilton, 2012
Sympycnodes digitata Kallies & D.J. Hilton, 2012
Sympycnodes dunnorum Kallies & D.J. Hilton, 2012
Sympycnodes interstincta Kallies & D.J. Hilton, 2012
Sympycnodes salterra Kallies & D.J. Hilton, 2012
Sympycnodes uptoni Kallies & D.J. Hilton, 2012

References

  & , 2012: Revision of Cossinae and small Zeuzerinae from Australia (Lepidoptera: Cossidae). Zootaxa 3454: 1-62. Abstract: .

External links
Natural History Museum Lepidoptera generic names catalog

Zeuzerinae